Caryocolum kasyi is a moth of the family Gelechiidae. It is found in Afghanistan.

The length of the forewings is about 6 mm. The forewings are greyish brown. The scales are greyish at the base and predominantly dark brown apically. There are greyish white markings and white costal and tornal spots. Adults have been recorded on wing from late June to early July.

References

Moths described in 1988
kasyi
Moths of Asia